Sean De Bie (born 3 October 1991 in Bonheiden) is a Belgian former racing cyclist, who rode professionally between 2013 and 2021 for five different teams. De Bie is the son of former cyclist Eddy De Bie and a nephew of former cyclist Danny De Bie, and was named in the start list for the 2016 Giro d'Italia.

Major results

2009
 1st Stage 1 Liège–La Gleize
 1st Stage 2 3 Giorni Orobica
 3rd Road race, National Junior Road Championships
 4th Paris–Roubaix Juniors
 6th Road race, UCI Juniors World Championships
 10th Chrono des Nations Juniors
2010
 4th Omloop Het Nieuwsblad U23
2011
 1st Stage 1 Toscana-Terra di Ciclismo
 2nd Grand Prix de Waregem
 3rd De Vlaamse Pijl
 4th Ronde van Midden-Nederland
2012
 2nd Ronde Van Vlaanderen Beloften
 4th La Côte Picarde
 5th Overall Le Triptyque des Monts et Châteaux
1st Stage 1
 5th Kattekoers
 8th De Vlaamse Pijl
2013
 1st  Road race, UEC European Under-23 Road Championships
 1st Stage 1 (TTT) Czech Cycling Tour
 2nd La Côte Picarde
 2nd Ronde Pévéloise
 3rd Arno Wallaard Memorial
 4th Ronde Van Vlaanderen Beloften
2014
 6th Overall Danmark Rundt
2015
 1st Grand Prix Impanis-Van Petegem
 1st Stage 4 Tour de Luxembourg
 3rd Druivenkoers Overijse
 5th Road race, National Road Championships
 5th Overall Three Days of De Panne
 5th Grote Prijs Stad Zottegem
2016
 1st  Overall Driedaagse van West-Vlaanderen
1st  Young rider classification
 2nd Overall Ster ZLM Toer
 5th Heistse Pijl
 6th Grote Prijs Jef Scherens
 9th Dwars door het Hageland
2018
 3rd Halle–Ingooigem
 4th GP Industria & Artigianato di Larciano
 4th Grand Prix of Aargau Canton
 5th Eschborn–Frankfurt
 5th Dwars door het Hageland
 8th Overall Étoile de Bessèges
1st Stage 4
 8th Nokere Koerse
 9th Kampioenschap van Vlaanderen
 10th Rund um Köln
 10th Grote Prijs Jef Scherens
2020
 5th Druivenkoers Overijse
2021
 2nd Tour du Finistère

Grand Tour general classification results timeline

References

External links

1991 births
Living people
Belgian male cyclists
People from Bonheiden
Cyclists from Antwerp Province